José García Guardiola (1921–1988) was a Spanish film actor.

Partial filmography

 Tales of the Alhambra (1950) - Oficial
 Furrows (1951) - Theater audience member
 Lola the Coalgirl (1952) - Gallardo
 Beauty and the Bullfighter (1954) - Manuel
 Cursed Mountain (1954) - Lucas
 Los ases buscan la paz (1955) - Yanos
 El cerco (1955) - Conrado
 The Cat (1956) - Pascual
 Desert Warrior (1957) - Kamal
 Trapped in Tangiers (1957) - Pistolero
 El hereje (1958)
 Melancholic Autumn (1958) - Giacomo
 Die Sklavenkarawane (1958) - Abu el Mot
 Toto in Madrid (1959) - José
 The Little Colonel (1960)
 Sentencia contra una mujer (1960)
 Melocotón en almíbar (1960) - Duque
 La banda de los ocho (1962)
 Dulcinea (1962) - Testigo en juicio
 Carta a una mujer (1963) - Germán Hernández 'El Asturias'
 Casablanca, Nest of Spies (1963) - Pierrot
 The Ceremony (1963) - Gate guard
 Tre per una rapina (1964)
 La boda (1964)
 Fuerte perdido (1964)
 Relevo para un pistolero (1964) - Jack Dillon
 El señor de La Salle (1964) - Carretero de Parmenia
 Hands of a Gunfighter (1965) - Johnny Castle
 Texas, Adios (1966) - McLeod
 Bridge Over the Elbe (1969) - German Commander
 A Bullet for Sandoval (1969) - Chihuahua Governor
 Transplant of a Brain (1970) - Vittorio Lamberti
 Me debes un muerto (1971) - Eusebio
 The Vampires Night Orgy (1973) - Mayor
 I Hate My Body (1974) - Sacerdote
 Tocata y fuga de Lolita (1974) - Ramiro Meana (voice, uncredited)
 Cuando los niños vienen de Marsella (1974) - Rufino Sánchez
 Leonor (1975)
 Pecado mortal (1977) - Comisario (voice, uncredited)
 El E.T.E. y el Oto (1983)
 Los santos inocentes (1984) - Señorito de la Jara
 Marbella (1985) - Patrick
 Policía (1987) - Don Ramón (final film role)

References

External links

1921 births
1988 deaths
Spanish male film actors
20th-century Spanish male actors